The women's beach volleyball tournament at the 2016 Olympic Games in Rio de Janeiro, Brazil, took place at the Copacabana Stadium. The competition was held from 6 to 17 August 2016. Twenty four teams with 48 athletes around the world competed for the gold medal.

The medals for the tournament were presented by Anita DeFrantz, IOC Member, Olympian one Bronze Medal, United States of America, and the gifts were presented by Dr. Ary Graça Filho, FIVB President.

Qualification

Pools composition
Twenty-four teams were drawn in six pools of four teams. The top six teams from the FIVB beach volleyball Olympic ranking as of 12 June 2016 were seeded at the first row of each pools from pool A to F. The seventh to ninth from the ranking were drawn first in pool F, E, or D. Then, the tenth to twelfth were drawn in pool C, B, or A. The next row was filled by the teams ranked thirteenth to seventeenth. These teams were drawn in pool A to E. The remaining spot of third row was filled by one of the five confederation continental cup champions. Then, the four remaining confederation continental cup champions were drawn in pool F to C. Finally, the winners and runners-up from the World Continental Cup were drawn in the last two spots. Teams from the same national Olympic committee could not be drawn in the same pool, except in the last drawing.

On 3 August 2016, Viktoria Orsi Toth from Italy was excluded from the women's tournament due to positive doping test for clostebol before the competition. Her place was replaced by Laura Giombini.

Draw

Venue

Format
The preliminary round was a competition between the twenty four teams divided into six groups of four teams. This round, the teams competed in a single round-robin format. The two highest ranked teams in each group and the two best third ranked teams advanced automatically to the knockout stage. The other four third ranked teams faced the lucky loser playoffs to take the last two spots. The fourth placed teams in each pool were ranked nineteenth in this competition. The losers from the lucky loser playoffs were tied seventeenth. The knockout stage followed the single-elimination format. The losers in the round of sixteen were ranked ninth. The four quarter-final losers finished fifth. The winners of the semi-finals competed for gold medals and the losers played for bronze medals.

Pool standing procedure
 Match points (2 for the winner, 1 for the loser, 0 for forfeit)
 Between 2 teams consider all teams points ratio / Between 3 teams consider head-to-head points ratio
 Seeding position of the pools composition

Referees
The following referees were selected for the tournament.

 Osvaldo Sumavil
 Mário Ferro
 Elizir Martins de Oliveira
 Lucie Guillemette
 Wang Lijun
 Juan Carlos Saavedra
 Charalampos Papadogoulas
 Davide Crescentini
 Mariko Satomi
 Carlos L. Rivera Rodriguez
 Roman Pristovakin
 Giovanni Bake
 José Maria Padron
 Jonas Personeni
 Kritsada Panaseri
 Daniel Apol

Preliminary round
All times are Brasília Time (UTC−03:00).

Pool A

Pool B

Pool C

Pool D

Pool E

Pool F

Lucky losers
The table below shows the ranking of third-placed teams in the preliminary round. The top two teams will advance to next round automatically. The other teams will compete for the two remaining spots. The third-ranked team will play with the sixth-ranked team, and the fourth-ranked team will play with the fifth-ranked team.

Lucky loser playoffs

Knockout stage
All times are Brasília Time (UTC−03:00).
The round of sixteen pair up were determined by drawing of lots. The six first ranked teams in preliminary pools were separated automatically. Then, the lucky loser playoffs winners were drawn. The two best third ranked were drawn next. And, the last drawing belonged to the second ranked teams. The teams in the same pool from preliminary round could not meet in round of 16.

Round of 16

Quarterfinals

Semifinals

Bronze medal game

Gold medal game

Final ranking

See also
Beach volleyball at the 2016 Summer Olympics – Men's tournament

References

External links
FIVB Official website
Ludwig/Walkenhorst - Olympic Gold Winners Journey

beach
2016 in beach volleyball
2016
2016 in women's volleyball
Women's events at the 2016 Summer Olympics